Dengfeng is a subdistrict of the Yuexiu District in Guangzhou City, Guangdong Province, southern China.

References 

Subdistricts of the People's Republic of China
Administrative divisions of Yuexiu District